1,4-Dihydropyridine (DHP) is an organic compound with the formula CH2(CH=CH)2NH.  The parent compound is uncommon, but derivatives of 1,4-dihydropyridine are important commercially and biologically. The pervasive cofactors NADH and NADPH are derivatives of 1,4-dihydropyridine. 1,4-Dihydropyridine-based drugs are L-type calcium channel blockers, used in the treatment of hypertension. 1,2-Dihydropyridines are also known.

Properties and reactions
A recurring feature of 1,4-dihydropyridines is the presence of substituents at the 2- and 6-positions.  Dihydropyridines are enamines, which otherwise tend to tautomerize or hydrolyze.

The dominant reaction of dihydropyridines is their ease of oxidation.  In the case of dihydropyridines with hydrogen as the substituent on nitrogen, oxidation yields pyridines:
CH2(CH=CR)2NH  →  C5H3R2N  +  H2
The naturally-occurring dihydropyridines NADH and NADPH contain N-alkyl groups.  Therefore, their oxidation does not yield pyridine, but N-alkylpyridinium cations:
CH2(CH=CR)2NR'  →  C5H3R2NR'  +  H−

See also

 Dihydropyridine calcium channel blockers
 Hantzsch ester
 Dihydropyridine receptor

References

External links